The "Hecale" (Hekalē) is a fragmentary Greek epyllion written by Callimachus during the third century BC. The eponymous heroine of the poem was an impoverished Attic widow with whom Theseus stayed on his way to subdue the Marathonian Bull. On his return from accomplishing this feat, Theseus found that his hostess had died, and, in return for her humble hospitality, the hero founded a deme named for her and established there a sanctuary of Zeus Hecaleus in her honor. Although poorly preserved by papyrus fragments and quotations in ancient authors, the broad outline of the Hecale is relatively certain, and the text stands as an important witness to the poorly understood genre of the Hellenistic epyllion. It was also extremely influential and was alluded to by later Hellenistic poets and, later, Roman writers such as Lucretius, Horace, Ovid and Apuleius.

The Rainer Fragments of the Hecale are one of the most important sources of our knowledge of the Hecale.  They are preserved on a piece of a wooden tablet now in the papyri collection of Archduke Rainer in the Royal Library at Vienna, and were first published by Theodor Gomperz in volume VI of the Mitteilungen aus der Sammlung Papyrus Erzherzog Rainer. The character of the writing, according to Wessely, assigns the tablet to the 4th century AD.

Editions and translations

Critical editions

.
.
.
.

References

Bibliography
 .
 .
 .
 .

External links
 Callimachus: Hecale - English translation of the fragments, adapted from C.A.Trypanis.

Ancient Greek poems
Lost poems
Callimachus